Promachoteuthis megaptera is a small, rare squid found in the Pacific Ocean near Japan.

External links

Tree of Life web project: Promachoteuthis megaptera

Squid
Molluscs described in 1885
Taxa named by William Evans Hoyle